Ira Charles Owens (born July 31, 1936) was an officer in the United States Army. From October 1991 to February 1995, Owens, then a Lieutenant General, served as the Deputy Chief of Staff for Intelligence, Headquarters, Department of the Army.

Owens was born in Cortez, Colorado. He is a 1954 graduate of Montrose High School in Montrose, Colorado, where he was known by his middle name Charles. Owens enlisted in the Army in 1956 and graduated from Artillery Officer Candidate School in 1960. He holds a B.A. degree in international relations from Whittier College and an M.S. degree in public affairs from Shippensburg State College.

General Owens is a member of the Military Intelligence Hall of Fame.

Awards and decorations
Owens' military awards included:

See also

References

1936 births
Living people
People from Cortez, Colorado
Military personnel from Colorado
United States Army personnel of the Vietnam War
Recipients of the Air Medal
Whittier College alumni
Recipients of the Meritorious Service Medal (United States)
Shippensburg University of Pennsylvania alumni
Recipients of the Legion of Merit
United States Army generals
Recipients of the Defense Superior Service Medal
Recipients of the Distinguished Service Medal (US Army)
Recipients of the Defense Distinguished Service Medal
Recipients of the Order of Military Merit (Brazil)